Euliphyra mirifica, the African moth butterfly, is a butterfly in the family Lycaenidae. It is found in Ghana, Nigeria, Cameroon, Gabon, the Republic of the Congo, the Central African Republic, northern Angola and the western two-thirds of the Democratic Republic of the Congo. The habitat consists of forests.

Adults have been recorded in June and July.

The larvae live in the nests of Oecophylla smaragdina race longinoda and feed on ant regurgitations.

References

External links
Die Gross-Schmetterlinge der Erde 13: Die Afrikanischen Tagfalter. Plate XIII 65 c

Butterflies described in 1890
Miletinae
Butterflies of Africa